is a private junior college in Saitama, Saitama, Japan, established in 1983. Though the institution is coeducational, female students greatly outnumbers male students. In July 2004 it was selected for Good Practice, a grant program by the Ministry of Education.

External links
 Official website 

Japanese junior colleges
Educational institutions established in 1983
Private universities and colleges in Japan
Universities and colleges in Saitama Prefecture
1983 establishments in Japan